is a Japanese comedian who performs tsukkomi (sometimes boke) and writes the gags for the comedy duo London Boots Ichi-gō Ni-gō. His partner in the duo is Atsushi Tamura.

Career

In June 2019, Tamura, alongside other Yoshimoto Kogyo affiliated comedians, was suspended from activities for appearing at yakuza-run parties. Tamura had also accepted  from the yakuza. Although the hard ban on the Tamura was lifted on August 19, he remained inactive in the industry until January 10, 2020, when it was announced that he will be returning as a talent under the agency London Boots, under an exclusive contract with Yoshimoto.

Personal life

Tamura is represented with Yoshimoto Creative Agency through Yoshimoto Kogyo in Tokyo up until January 9, 2020. He transferred to the personal agency London Boots, created by his comedic duo partner Atsushi Tamura on January 10, 2020. He graduated from Osaka Prefectural Akutagawa High School.

Filmography

TV programmes

Current appearances

Former appearances

TV dramas

Films

Anime films

Radio

Advertisements

Video games

Magazines

References

External links 

 – Yoshimoto Kogyo Geinin Profile 

Japanese comedians
Japanese television personalities
Japanese male actors
1972 births
Living people
People from Takatsuki, Osaka